(–)-2β-Carbomethoxy-3β-(4-tolyl)tropane (RTI-4229-32, tolpane) is a phenyltropane-based cocaine analogue that has similar properties in vitro to related drugs such as RTI-31.

See also 
 2β-Propanoyl-3β-(4-tolyl)-tropane
 RTI-120
 RTI-150
 List of cocaine analogues

References 

Tropanes
RTI compounds
Dopamine reuptake inhibitors
Sympathomimetic amines
Medical imaging
Neuroimaging